San-Pédro is a city in southwestern Ivory Coast. It is the nation's second largest port and the seat of Bas-Sassandra District and San-Pédro Region. It is also a commune and the seat of and a sub-prefecture of San-Pédro Department. In the 2014 census, the city had a population of 164,944, making it the sixth-largest city in the country. The city is served by San Pédro Airport.

Northwest of the city lies the Taï National Park, known as one of the last sanctuaries of the pygmy hippopotamus, which is listed on the UNESCO's World Heritage List.

Economy 

Largely developed from the 1960s, fishing is an important industry, while the town is known for its nightlife and its beaches.

Transport 

A railway is proposed from San-Pédro to iron ore deposits around Mount Nimba.  There would be no immediate connection with the existing metre gauge national railway at Abidjan.

Education
 is located in San-Pédro.

Notable people 
 Jean-Philippe Gbamin (born 25 September 1995), is a French footballer

Villages
The twenty eight villages of the sub-prefecture of San-Pédro and their population in 2014 are:

Gallery

See also 

 Cement in Africa
 Railway stations in Ivory Coast

In 2014, the population of the sub-prefecture of San-Pédro was 261,616.

References 

 
Sub-prefectures of San-Pédro Region
District capitals of Ivory Coast
Communes of San-Pédro Region
Regional capitals of Ivory Coast
Ivory Coast geography articles needing translation from French Wikipedia